David Březina (born 16 February 1997) is a Czech footballer who plays for FK Viktoria Žižkov as a defender.

Career

FK Senica
Březina made his professional debut for Senica against AS Trenčín on 23 July 2016.

References

External links
 FK Senica official club profile
 Eurofotbal profile
  
 Futbalnet Profile

1997 births
Living people
Czech footballers
Czech expatriate footballers
Association football defenders
AC Sparta Prague players
FK Senica players
FC Sellier & Bellot Vlašim players
FC Silon Táborsko players
FK Viktoria Žižkov players
Czech National Football League players
Slovak Super Liga players
Footballers from Prague
Expatriate footballers in Slovakia
Czech expatriate sportspeople in Slovakia
SFC Opava players
Bohemian Football League players